Mohammad-Reza Pour-Mohammadi (born 1958 in Tabriz, East Azerbaijan) is the former governor of East Azerbaijan province, from 2018 to 2021. He was the President of Tabriz University from January 2014 to September 2018 and also from 2002 to 2005 at Reform Government.

Early life
Pour-Mohammadi was born in 1958 in Tabriz at Azerbaijani parents. He graduated high school in Tabriz, and graduated with a PhD in Urban Planning from Cardiff University.

Background
 Chairman of the Tenth Congress of the International Conference of Civil Engineering in the University of Tabriz.
 Cooperation with educational institutions Nakhchivan.
 Cooperation with the Ganja State University.
 The host of Caucasus University Association in Tabriz.
 Specialized meetings begin with professors Tabriz and Baku Chaired by Pour-Mohammadi.

References

1958 births
Living people
Academic staff of the University of Tabriz
People from Tabriz
Alumni of Cardiff University
Presidents of the University of Tabriz